Rushdy Armanios (born 8 September 1963) is an Egyptian boxer. He competed in the men's light welterweight event at the 1984 Summer Olympics.

References

External links
 

1963 births
Living people
Egyptian male boxers
Olympic boxers of Egypt
Boxers at the 1984 Summer Olympics
Place of birth missing (living people)
Light-welterweight boxers
20th-century Egyptian people